The Episcopal Diocese of Atlanta is the diocese of the Episcopal Church in the United States of America, with jurisdiction over middle and north Georgia. It is in Province IV of the Episcopal Church and its cathedral, the Cathedral of St. Philip, is in Atlanta, as are the diocesan offices.

History

The Anglican presence in Georgia was established on February 12, 1733, with Christ Church in Savannah, Georgia. By 1841, the Diocese of Georgia had been established. In 1907 the diocesan convention unanimously voted to divide the diocese, forming the Diocese of Atlanta. In December 1907, the Diocese of Atlanta held its first convention at Christ Church in Macon, Georgia. 

In 2007, the diocese celebrated its centennial, and published a history of the diocese: The Diocese of Atlanta:  Centennial Celebration 1907–2007, which is available from the Cathedral of St. Philip Book Store, Atlanta, Georgia.

For much of its history, the Diocese has been one of the fastest-growing in the South, if not the country, due to the almost-geometric expansion of the population of metropolitan Atlanta. Although evangelical and high-church alternatives have always existed, most congregations generally hold to a Broad Church, moderate-to-liberal theology and middle-of-the-road worship, with some parishes priding themselves on their progressive stances. The Atlanta Diocese is thus considerably more liberal than many of the dioceses in the Fourth Province, since the area is home to a large population of highly educated, affluent professionals and white-collar employees, constituencies that have long been a mainstay of the Episcopal Church and that are not present in such large numbers elsewhere in the South.

On June 26, 2015, Bishop Wright announced that congregations within the Diocese could perform same-sex marriages.

Bishops
The current bishop is Robert Christopher Wright, who was installed in October 2012. The immediate past bishop is J. Neil Alexander, who was installed in 2001. On January 25, 2006, he was nominated for election as Presiding Bishop, but he was defeated at the 2006 General Convention by Katharine Jefferts Schori.

List of bishops

Parishes and missions

The Diocese of Atlanta has 10 convocations (also known as deaneries) divided into 94 parishes and more than 55,000 parishioners. 
 Chattahoochee Valley Convocation
 St. Mary Magdalene Church, Columbus
 St. Thomas Church, Columbus
 Trinity Church, Columbus
 St. Nicholas' Church, Hamilton
 St. Mark's Church, LaGrange
 St. John's Church, West Point
 St. Thomas of Canterbury Church, Thomaston
 Zion Church, Talbotton
 East Atlanta Convocation
 Church of the Epiphany, Atlanta
 Church of Our Saviour, Atlanta
 St. Bartholomew's Church, Atlanta
 St. Bede's Church, Atlanta
 St. Simon's Church, Conyers
 Church of the Good Shepherd, Covington
 Holy Trinity Church, Decatur
 Emory Campus Ministry
Macon Convocation
 All Angels' Church, Eatonton
 St. Andrew's Church, Fort Valley
 St. Luke's Church, Fort Valley
Christ Church, Macon
 St. Francis' Church, Macon
 St. Paul's Church, Macon
 St. Stephen's Church, Milledgeville
 St. Mary's Church, Montezuma
 St. Christopher's Church, Perry
 All Saints' Church, Warner Robins
Marietta Convocation
 St. Aidan's Church, Alpharetta-Milton
 St. Clement's Church, Canton
 Church of the Holy Spirit, Cumming
 Church of the Holy Family, Jasper
 Christ Church, Kennesaw
 Church of the Annunciation, Marietta
 St. Catherine's Church, Marietta
 St. James' Church, Marietta
 St. Jude's Church, Marietta
 St. Peter & St. Paul's Church, Marietta
 St. Teresa's Church, Acworth
 St. Benedict's Church, Smyrna
 St. David's Church, Roswell
Mid-Atlanta Convocation
 St. Paul's Church, Atlanta
All Saints' Church, Atlanta
 Church of the Incarnation, Atlanta
St. Luke's Church, Atlanta
 Cathedral of St. Philip, Atlanta
 St. Timothy's Church, Decatur
 Church of the Holy Cross, Decatur
 Iglesia de Santa Maria, East Point
 Georgia Tech/Georgia State Campus
 North Atlanta Convocation
 Emmaus House Community Center, Atlanta
 Holy Comforter Church, Atlanta
 Holy Innocents' Church, Atlanta
 St. Anne's Church, Atlanta
 St. Dunstan's Church, Atlanta
 St. Martin in the Fields Church, Atlanta
 Church of the Atonement, Sandy Springs
Northeast Georgia Convocation
 St. Gregory the Great Church, Athens
 Emmanuel Church, Athens
 UGA Center, Athens
 St. Clare's Church, Blairsville
 Grace-Calvary Church, Clarkesville
 Church of the Resurrection, Sautee-Nacoochee
 St. Elizabeth's Church, Dahlonega
 Grace Church, Gainesville
 Church of the Redeemer, Greensboro
 St. Alban's Church, Monroe
 St. Matthias' Church, Toccoa
 St. Gabriel's Church, Oakwood
 Church of the Advent, Madison
 Church of the Mediator, Washington
 St. Andrew's Church, Hartwell
 St. Anthony's Church, Winder
 St. Alban's Church, Elberton
 St. James' Church, Clayton
 Northeast Metro Convocation
 St. Michael & All Angels' Church, Stone Mountain
 St. Mary & St. Martha of Bethany Church, Buford
 St. Matthew's Church, Snellville
 St. Patrick's Church, Dunwoody
 Christ Church, Norcross
 Christ the King, Lilburn
 St. Columba's Church, Johns Creek
 St. Edward's Church, Lawrenceville
 Northwest Georgia Convocation
 St. Timothy's Church, Calhoun
 St. Peter's Church, Rome 
 Church of the Transfiguration, Rome
 St. Barnabas' Church, Trion
 Church of the Ascension, Cartersville
 St. James' Church, Cedartown
 St. Mark's Church, Dalton
Southwest Atlanta Convocation
 St. Paul's Church, Newnan
 St. Margaret's Church, Carrollton
 St. Andrew's in the Pines, Peachtree City
 St. Augustine of Canterbury Church, Morrow
 St. John's Church, College Park
 Church of the Good Shepherd, Austell
 Church of the Nativity, Fayetteville
 St. George's Church, Griffin
 St. Joseph's Church, McDonough
 St. Julian's Church, Douglasville

Schools
 Children of Grace Preschool, Gainesville
 Emmanuel Episcopal Day School, Athens
 Holy Innocents' Episcopal School, Atlanta
 Redeemer Episcopal Academy, Eatonton
 St. Anne's Day School, Atlanta
 St. Benedict's Episcopal Day School, Smyrna
 St. Laurence Education Center, Acworth
 St. Mark's Kindergarten, LaGrange
 St. Martin's Episcopal School, Atlanta
 St. Matthew's Preschool, Snellville

College chaplaincies
 Absalom Jones Episcopal Student Center and Chapel, Atlanta
 Emory Episcopal Center, Atlanta
 Episcopal Center at Georgia Tech & GSU, Atlanta
 UGA Episcopal Center, Athens
 Canterbury Club of Kennesaw State University, a ministry of Christ Church, Kennesaw
 Canterbury Club of Northwest Georgia for Berry College, Shorter University and Georgia Highlands College
 Middle Georgia Campus Ministry for Wesleyan, Mercer, and Middle Georgia State University

Ministries
 Appleton Family Ministries, Macon
 Chattahoochee Valley Episcopal Ministry, Columbus
 Church of the Common Ground, Atlanta
 Church of the Holy Comforter, Atlanta
 Emmaus House, Atlanta
 Episcopal Community Foundation for Middle and North Georgia, Atlanta
 Mikell Camp and Conference Center, Toccoa
 New Hope House, Griffin
 Path To Shine, Smyrna
 Society of St. Anna the Prophet, Atlanta
 The Road - The Episcopal Service Corps of Atlanta

See also
 List of Succession of Bishops for the Episcopal Church, USA

References

Website of the Diocese of Atlanta

External links

Official Web site of the Diocese of Atlanta
Cathedral of St. Philip
Official Web site of the Episcopal Church
Journal of the Annual Council, Diocese of Atlanta

1907 establishments in Georgia (U.S. state)
Anglican dioceses established in the 20th century
Christian organizations established in 1907
Christianity in Atlanta
Atlanta
Diocese of Atlanta
Atlanta